Trigger Man  or Triggerman may refer to one of the following:

 Trigger Man (video game), a third-person shooter video game
 Triggerman (film), a 1948 Western
 Trigger Man (2007 film), a 2007 film thriller
 Allan Caidic, basketball player, nicknamed The Triggerman
 Triggerman beat, a specific collections of samples and beats, which forms the foundation of the bounce style of hip hop